Pauline van Roessel (born 9 May 1967) is a Canadian rower. She competed in the women's eight event at the 2004 Summer Olympics. The team has finished in 7th place at the 2004 Summer Olympics held in Athens, Greece. Her current residence is in Calgary, Alberta.

References

External links
 

1967 births
Living people
Canadian female rowers
Olympic rowers of Canada
Rowers at the 2004 Summer Olympics
Sportspeople from Alberta